Jean-Pierre Cortot (20 August 1787 – 12 August 1843) was a French neoclassical sculptor.

Life 

Cortot was born and died in Paris.  He was educated at the École des Beaux Arts in Paris, and won the Prix de Rome in 1809, residing in the Villa Medici in Rome from 1810 to 1813.

Cortot worked in an austere, correct, academic neo-classical style, heir to both classic French models from the late 18th century and the Greco-Roman tradition. His art took on a more romantic expression toward the end of his life.

Appointed a professor at the École, succeeding Charles Dupaty, he was made a member of the Académie des beaux-arts in 1825, again replacing Dupaty.  He was made an Officer of the Légion d'honneur in 1841.

Among his students were Joseph-Marius Ramus, Jean-Jacques Feuchère, Pierre-Charles Simart, Jean-Auguste Barre, and the animalier Pierre Louis Rouillard. A street in Montmartre bears his name, and Cortot's grave can be found in Père Lachaise Cemetery.

Early works and works completed in Rome
Source: WikiPhidias

Winning the Prix de Rome entitled him to study at the Académie de France in Rome and whilst there he completed several works which were sent back to Paris. He remained in Rome for 5 years.

 Melpomène. Part of a "surtout" or table decoration. Executed 1808. Held by the Sèvres Cité de la Céramique.
 La contemplation céleste This 1820 piece is held by the Beaux-arts de Paris, l'école nationale supérieure and was created by Cortot for a competition organised by the school called "Tête d'expression".
 Déïdamie. Part of a "surtout" or table decoration. Executed 1812. Held by the Sèvres Cité de la Céramique.
 Pandora. Marble work dating to 1819 now held in the Musée des Beaux-arts de Lyon.
 Narcisse debout. Marble work dated 1818 held in the Musée des Beaux-arts of Angers. Was shown at the Salon des artistes français in 1814
 Un jeune pêcheur. Rome.
 Hyacinthe blessé. Rome.
 Napoléon 1er. Cortot only completed the plaster model. The project was abandoned when the Empire fell.
 Phaéton se plaignant à sa mère de l'insulte qu'il a reçue d'Epaphus. Rome.
 Ulysse, sous le costume d'un mendiant, racontant ses aventures à Pénélope. Rome.
 Un soldat combattant. Rome.
 Bust of the painter Guillaume Guillon-Lethière. Rome. 1813.
 Louis XVIII. Rome. 1816 à 1817.
 Un philosophe. Rome.

Works after Rome
Source: WikiPhidias

Gallery of images

References

Sources 

 This page translated from its French equivalent accessed 9/14/2010

External links
 

1787 births
1843 deaths
Burials at Père Lachaise Cemetery
French architectural sculptors
19th-century French sculptors
French male sculptors
Officiers of the Légion d'honneur
Artists from Paris
Prix de Rome for sculpture
Members of the Académie des beaux-arts
19th-century French male artists